9712 Nauplius  is a mid-sized Jupiter trojan from the Greek camp, approximately  in diameter. It was discovered during the second Palomar–Leiden Trojan survey at the Palomar Observatory in 1973 and later named after Nauplius the Wrecker, from Greek mythology. The dark Jovian asteroid has a rotation period of 19.4 hours.

Discovery 

Nauplius was discovered on 19 September 1973, by Dutch astronomer couple Ingrid and Cornelis van Houten at Leiden, on photographic plates taken by astronomer Tom Gehrels at the Palomar Observatory in California. The body's observation arc begins with its official discovery observation at Palomar.

Palomar–Leiden Trojan survey 

Despite being discovered during the second Palomar–Leiden Trojan survey in 1973, Nauplius has not received a provisional survey designation prefixed with "T-2". The survey was a fruitful collaboration between the Palomar and Leiden observatories during the 1960s and 1970s. Gehrels used Palomar's Samuel Oschin telescope (also known as the 48-inch Schmidt Telescope), and shipped the photographic plates to Ingrid and Cornelis van Houten at Leiden Observatory where astrometry was carried out. The trio are credited with the discovery of several thousand asteroids.

Orbit and classification 

Nauplius is a dark Jupiter trojan in a 1:1 orbital resonance with Jupiter. It is located in the leading Greek camp at the Gas Giant's  Lagrangian point, 60° ahead on its orbit . It is also a non-family asteroid of the Jovian background population. It orbits the Sun at a distance of 4.6–5.9 AU once every 12 years (4,374 days; semi-major axis of 5.23 AU). Its orbit has an eccentricity of 0.13 and an inclination of 8° with respect to the ecliptic.

Naming 

This minor planet was named after Nauplius, a son of Poseidon and Amymone. He was a king of Euboea and the father of Palamedes, who was killed after a false accusation by Odysseus during the Trojan War. Nauplius revenged the death of his son by placing lights on the cliffs of his kingdom, causing the Greek fleet to shipwreck on its return from Troy. The official naming citation was published by the Minor Planet Center on 2 April 1999.

Physical characteristics 

Nauplius is an assumed C-type asteroid, while the majority of larger Jupiter trojans are D-types.

Rotation period 

In March 2014, a first rotational lightcurve of Nauplius was obtained from photometric observations over a total of eight nights by Robert Stephens at the Center for Solar System Studies in Landers, California. Lightcurve analysis gave a rotation period of  hours with a relatively high brightness amplitude of 0.48 magnitude.

Diameter and albedo 

According to the survey carried out by the NEOWISE mission of NASA's Wide-field Infrared Survey Explorer, Nauplius measures 33.42 kilometers in diameter and its surface has an albedo of 0.083, while the Collaborative Asteroid Lightcurve Link assumes a standard albedo for a carbonaceous asteroid of 0.057 and calculates a diameter of 38.51 kilometers based on an absolute magnitude of 10.8.

Notes

References

External links 
 Asteroid Lightcurve Database (LCDB), query form (info )
 Dictionary of Minor Planet Names, Google books
 Discovery Circumstances: Numbered Minor Planets (5001)-(10000) – Minor Planet Center
 Asteroid 9712 Nauplius at the Small Bodies Data Ferret
 
 

009712
Discoveries by Cornelis Johannes van Houten
Discoveries by Ingrid van Houten-Groeneveld
Discoveries by Tom Gehrels
Named minor planets
19730919